Longitarsus obliteratus is a species of beetle from Chrysomelidae family.

Description
The species is green coloured, and has orange legs and antennae. The males are smaller than the females.

Distribution
The species can be found in Europe, including Southern England and North Poland. It can also be found in Asia, including Asia Minor, the Caucasus, the Middle East, Afghanistan and Iran.

References

Beetles described in 1847
O
Beetles of Asia
Beetles of Europe